Micromonospora sediminimaris is a Gram-positive bacterium from the genus Micromonospora which has been isolated from deep sea sediments from the South China Sea.

References

External links
Type strain of Verrucosispora sediminis at BacDive -  the Bacterial Diversity Metadatabase	

Micromonosporaceae
Bacteria described in 2010